Mahakavi Kalidas is a Bollywood film directed by Niren Lahiri. It was released in 1942.

Plot
After falling in love with a woman from a lower caste, a naive Sanskrit poet who was ostracized now encounters obstacles when he participates in a competition against a princess.

Cast
 Karuna Banerjee
 Chhabi Biswas
 Menaka Devi
 Padmadevi
 Ulhas

References

External links
 

1942 films
1940s Hindi-language films
Indian musical drama films
1940s musical drama films
Indian black-and-white films
1942 drama films